Walter Sturman (29 August 1882 – 24 July 1958) was an English cricketer.  Sturman was a right-handed batsman who fielded as a wicket-keeper.  He was born at Leicester, Leicestershire.

Sturman made his first-class debut for Leicestershire against Kent at Aylestone Road in the 1909 County Championship.  He made 23 further first-class appearances for the county, the last of which came against the touring Australians in 1912. In his 24 first-class matches for Leicestershire, he scored 273 runs at an average of 10.11, with a high score of 46.  Behind the stumps he took 28 catches and made five stumpings.

He died at Aylestone, Leicestershire, on 24 July 1958.

References

External links
Walter Sturman at ESPNcricinfo
Walter Sturman at CricketArchive

1882 births
1958 deaths
Cricketers from Leicester
English cricketers
Leicestershire cricketers
People from Aylestone
Wicket-keepers